Rosa Lesser was an Austrian luger who competed during the early 1950s. She won the bronze medal in the women's singles event at the 1953 European championships in Cortina d'Ampezzo, Italy.

References
List of European luge champions 

Austrian female lugers
Possibly living people
Year of birth missing